São José do Herval is a municipality in the state of Rio Grande do Sul, Brazil, commonly known as Dead Donkey (Burro Morto) by the inhabitants of the region.  As of 2020, the estimated population was 1,943.

See also
List of municipalities in Rio Grande do Sul

References

Municipalities in Rio Grande do Sul